Alexander Manson may refer to:
 Alexander Manson (physician), Scottish physician
 Alexander Malcolm Manson (1883–1964) British Columbia judge and politician
 Alexander Manson (rower) (born 1953), Canadian Olympic rower
 Alexander Philip Manson, Lord-Lieutenant of Aberdeenshire